Donton Samuel Mkandawire (died 24 December 2011) was a Malawian politician, educator, diplomat, and former Minister of Education and Member of Parliament for the Mzimba Central seat in the Mzimba District.

He studied for a Bachelor of Education degree at Kingswood Methodist College at the University of Western Australia under a Nyasaland State Scholarship. As an educator, he served as a professor at the University of Namibia. Mkandawire served as head of Malawi Examinations Board (Maneb) and Malawi Institute of Education. In 1988, there was a scandal at Maneb where 10 northerners were removed for allegedly conspiring to influence the Malawi Certificate of Education school exams with Mkandawire who was the head of the board and also from the northern region. There was no evidence of this allegation, but northerners were not on the Maneb board for several years after.  He was assigned a diplomatic post to Kenya at the same time but due to these allegations, he did not take this post but instead fled the country.

Mkandawire was a member of the United Democratic Front (UDF) under the Bakili Muluzi administration. He was also the Minister of education. In 2009, he switched parties to Democratic Progressive Party (DPP) and served as Chief Executive Officer of Lilongwe City Assembly. He later ran and won the seat of MP for Mzimba. He died on 24 December 2011 at Mwaiwathu Hospital in Blantyre from cancer.

Books
Application of a decision theory model to evaluate selection tests, 1975

References

Democratic Progressive Party (Malawi) politicians
Government ministers of Malawi
Members of the National Assembly (Malawi)
Malawian educators
Malawian diplomats
United Democratic Front (Malawi) politicians
Academic staff of the University of Namibia
University of Western Australia alumni
2011 deaths
Year of birth missing